Ziganovka (Yegän) is a rural locality (a selo) in Makarovsky Selsoviet of Ishimbaysky District of the Republic of Bashkortostan, Russia, located near the Zigan River.

References

Rural localities in Ishimbaysky District